Velmer A. Fassel (26 April 1919 – 4 March 1998) was an American chemist who developed the inductively coupled plasma (ICP) and demonstrated its use as ion source for mass spectrometry.

Early life and education 
 1941 B.A. Southeast Missouri State College
 1947 Ph.D. Iowa State University

Research interests 
 Atomic spectroscopy

Awards 
 1971 Anachem Award

References

20th-century American chemists
Iowa State University faculty
1919 births
1998 deaths
Chemists from Missouri
Southeast Missouri State University alumni
Iowa State University alumni